Bevo HC is a Dutch handball club from Panningen, Limburg. The club was founded on 1 July 1987 after the merger of BEVO and Heldia. The men's team competes in the BENE-League in the season 2019-2020. The woman's team competes in eredivisie in the season 2019-2020.

Crest, colours, supporters

Kits

Accomplishments

Men
NHV Eredivisie: 
Winners (1) : 2014
Runner-Up (3) : 2004, 2009, 2016

Dutch Handball Cup: 
Winners (1) : 2018
Runner-Up (5) : 2001, 2004, 2005, 2007, 2008

Dutch Supercup: 
Winners (3) : 2004, 2007, 2014
Runner-Up (1) : 2018

External links
 Official website
 EHF Profile

Dutch handball clubs
Peel en Maas